Oleksandr Tolstyak (born 4 February 1990) is a professional Ukrainian football midfielder who plays for FC Sumy in the Ukrainian First League.

Tolstyak is the product of RVUFK Kyiv's Youth Sportive School. In February 2013 he signed a contract with FC Bukovyna.

References

External links
Profile at FFU Official Site (Ukr)

1990 births
Living people
People from Netishyn
Ukrainian footballers
FC Obolon-Brovar Kyiv players
FC Arsenal-Kyivshchyna Bila Tserkva players
FC Zirka Kropyvnytskyi players
PFC Sumy players
Ukrainian Premier League players
Association football midfielders
Sportspeople from Khmelnytskyi Oblast